The Dreadful Hours is the seventh album by My Dying Bride, released on 13 November 2001. It contains a remake of "The Return of the Beautiful" (renamed "The Return to the Beautiful") from the band's debut album, As the Flower Withers.
The Dreadful Hours was issued in a digipak with a full colour booklet.

Track listing

Personnel
 Aaron Stainthorpe - vocals
 Andrew Craighan - guitars
 Hamish Glencross - guitars
 Adrian Jackson - bass
 Shaun Taylor-Steels - drums

Additional Personnel
 Jonny Maudling - keyboards
 Yasmin Ahmed - keyboards on "A Cruel Taste of Winter"

References

My Dying Bride albums
2001 albums